Professor Abbas Vali (born 1949) is a Kurdish political and social theorist specialising in modern and contemporary political thought and modern Middle Eastern Politics.

Biography
Vali was born in 1949 in Mahabad, Iran. He received his primary and secondary education in Tabriz. He obtained a BA in Political Science from the National University of Iran in 1973. He then moved to the UK to continue his graduate studies in modern political and social theory. He obtained an MA in Politics from the University of Keele in 1976. He then received his PhD in Sociology from the University of London in 1983. This was followed by a post-doctoral research fellowship funded by the Economic and Social Research Council in 1984.

Abbas Vali began his academic career in 1986 in the Department of Political Theory and Government at the University of Wales, Swansea. He was invited by the Kurdistan Regional Government (KRG) to establish and lead a new university in Erbil in 2005. He was the Vice-Chancellor of the University of Kurdistan before he was removed for disagreements with the KRG over the management of the university in May 2008. Professor Vali has since been teaching Modern Social and Political Theory in the Department of Sociology at Boğaziçi University in Istanbul.

Selected works
Pre-Capitalist Iran: A Theoretical History, New York: New York University Press, 1993.
Essays on the Origins of Kurdish Nationalism, (ed.), Costa Mesa, Mezda Publisher, 2003.
Modernity and the Stateless: The Kurdish Question in Iran, London, I.B. Tauris, 2012.
Kurds and the State in Iran: The Making of Kurdish Identity, London, I.B. Tauris, 2011.
Kurdish Nationalism in Iran: The Forgotten Years (1947-1979), Istanbul, Avesta Publications, 2011.
'The Kurds and their Others: Fragmented Identity and Fragmented Politics', Comparative Studies of South Asia, Africa and the Middle East. Vol. XVIII, no.2, 1998.
'Nationalism and Kurdish Historical Writing'. New Perspectives on Turkey. Spring 1996, 14.

Sources
Details of Prof. Vali's Essays on the Origins of Kurdish Nationalism
Prof. Abbas Vali's books in amazon.com
 Prof. Abbas Vali's books in I.B. Tauris Publishers
Prof. Abbas Vali's books in I.B. Tauris Publishers 
Prof. Abbas Vali's books in I.B. Tauris Publishers

References

External links
kurdishperspective Website
Avesta Publications Website

1949 births
Living people
Alumni of Birkbeck, University of London
People from Mahabad
Iranian Kurdish people
Kurdish academics
Kurdish scholars
Kurdish historians
Kurdish sociologists
20th-century Kurdish people
21st-century Kurdish people
Shahid Beheshti University alumni